Colonel (retired) Bzigu Lassa Afakirya was the Military Administrator of Kogi State, Nigeria from August 1996 to August 1998 during the military regime of General Sani Abacha.
When he assumed office he dissolved and reconstituted the Local Government Service Commission.
Following the return to democracy, as a former military administrator he was required to retire from the army.
In October 2005, he was awarded fellowship of the Kogi State Polytechnic.

References

Nigerian Army officers
Living people
Governors of Kogi State
Year of birth missing (living people)